James Townsend Mackay (1775–1862) was a Scottish botanist who lived in Ireland.

Life
He was born in Kirkcaldy, Fifeshire, about 1775. 
After being educated at the parish school he was trained as a gardener, and having filled several posts in Scotland went to Ireland in 1803.

He visited the west of the island in 1804 and 1805, and as a result published a 'Catalogue of the Rarer Plants of Ireland' in the Transactions of the Royal Dublin Society for the following year. 
This catalogue he enlarged into the 'Catalogue of the Indigenous Plants of Ireland,' published in 1825 in the Transactions of the Royal Irish Academy, which was again the basis of his Flora Hibernica, published in 1836, the cryptogamic portion of which was by Drs. Harvey and Taylor. 

The governors of Trinity College, Dublin, having determined to establish a botanical garden, Mackay was recommended to them as a curator, and he held the post from 1806 until his death. 
Soon after his appointment he was elected an associate of the Linnean Society, and in 1850 the university of Dublin bestowed upon him the degree of LL.D. 
He was attacked by paralysis about 1860, and died of bronchitis in Dublin 25 February 1862.
 
Mackay discovered several species of plants new to the British Isles, and contributed largely to Sir J. E. Smith's English Botany (1790–1814). 
His herbarium is preserved at Trinity College Dublin. 
Several unsuccessful attempts were made to perpetuate his name, which is now borne by a genus of seaweeds, Mackaya, so named by Dr. Harvey, and by a species of heather, Erica mackayana.

Works
Flora Hibernica: comprising the Flowering plants, Ferns, Caraceae, Musci, Hepaticae, Lichenes and Algae of Ireland.(William Curry Jun and Company, Dublin, 1836).  Full text.

References

Attribution

Sources
University of Dublin; History, with Biographical Notices. William B. S. Taylor. London, 1845.

External links
History of College Botanic Gardens

19th-century Irish botanists
People associated with Trinity College Dublin
1775 births
1862 deaths
Scottish emigrants to Ireland
People from Kirkcaldy